Nesareh-ye Bozorg (also Romanized as Nes̄āreh-ye Bozorg; also known as Nathārah, Nes̄ār-e Bozorg, Nes̄āreh-ye Borzog, Noşāreh, and Nos̄s̄āreh) is a village in Darkhoveyn Rural District, in the Central District of Shadegan County, Khuzestan Province, Iran. At the 2006 census, its population was 394, in 82 families.

References 

Populated places in Shadegan County